The 1988–89 New York Knicks season was the 43rd season for the team in the National Basketball Association (NBA). During the off-season, the Knicks acquired Charles Oakley from the Chicago Bulls. At midseason, the team acquired Kiki Vandeweghe from the Portland Trail Blazers. In the regular season, the Knicks held a 32–16 record at the All-Star break, finished with a 52–30 record, and won the Atlantic Division title for the first time since 1970–71. 

Patrick Ewing averaged 22.7 points, 9.3 rebounds, 1.5 steals and 3.5 blocks per game, and was named to the All-NBA Second Team and NBA All-Defensive Second Team, and finished in fourth place in Most Valuable Player voting. In addition, second-year guard Mark Jackson averaged 16.9 points, 8.6 assists and 1.9 steals per game, and Johnny Newman provided the team with 16.0 points and 1.4 steals per game. Gerald Wilkins contributed 14.3 points and 1.4 steals per game, while Oakley provided with 12.9 points, 10.5 rebounds and 1.3 steals per game, and top draft pick Rod Strickland contributed 8.9 points and 3.9 assists per game off the bench, and was named to the NBA All-Rookie Second Team. Ewing and Jackson were both selected to play in the 1989 NBA All-Star Game, which was Jackson's first and only All-Star appearance. Kenny Walker won the Slam Dunk Contest during the All-Star Weekend in Houston, and head coach Rick Pitino finished in sixth place in Coach of the Year voting.

In the playoffs, the Knicks swept the Philadelphia 76ers, 3–0 in the Eastern Conference first round, to advance to the Eastern Conference Semi-finals, where the team lost to Michael Jordan, and the 6th-seeded Chicago Bulls in six games. 

Following the season, Pitino resigned after two seasons with the Knicks and became the head coach at the University of Kentucky, and Sidney Green left in the 1989 NBA Expansion Draft.

Draft picks

Roster

Regular season

Season standings

z – clinched division title
y – clinched division title
x – clinched playoff spot

Record vs. opponents

Game log

Regular season

|- align="center" bgcolor="#ffcccc"
| 1
| November 4
| @ Boston
|
|
|
|
|
|
|- align="center" bgcolor="#ffcccc"
| 2
| November 5
| @ New Jersey
|
|
|
|
|
|
|- align="center" bgcolor="#ccffcc"
| 3
| November 8, 1988
| Chicago
| W 126–117
|
|
|
| Madison Square Garden
| 1–2
|- align="center" bgcolor="#ccffcc"
| 4
| November 9
| @ Washington
|
|
|
|
|
|
|- align="center" bgcolor="#ccffcc"
| 5
| November 11
| @ Indiana
|
|
|
|
|
|
|- align="center" bgcolor="#ccffcc"
| 6
| November 12
| Washington
|
|
|
|
|
|
|- align="center" bgcolor="#ccffcc"
| 7
| November 15
| @ Houston
|
|
|
|
|
|
|- align="center" bgcolor="#ffcccc"
| 8
| November 18
| @ Philadelphia
|
|
|
|
|
|
|- align="center" bgcolor="#ccffcc"
| 9
| November 19
| Philadelphia
|
|
|
|
|
|
|- align="center" bgcolor="#ffcccc"
| 10
| November 22, 1988
| L.A. Lakers
| L 98–110
|
|
|
| Madison Square Garden
| 6–4
|- align="center" bgcolor="#ccffcc"
| 11
| November 23, 1988
| @ Detroit
| W 133–111
|
|
|
| Palace of Auburn Hills
| 7–4
|- align="center" bgcolor="#ccffcc"
| 12
| November 26
| Cleveland
|
|
|
|
|
|
|- align="center" bgcolor="#ffcccc"
| 13
| November 29
| @ Denver
|
|
|
|
|
|
|- align="center" bgcolor="#ccffcc"
| 14
| November 30
| @ L.A. Clippers
|
|
|
|
|
|

|- align="center" bgcolor="#ccffcc"
| 15
| December 2
| @ Dallas
|
|
|
|
|
|
|- align="center" bgcolor="#ffcccc"
| 16
| December 3
| @ San Antonio
|
|
|
|
|
|
|- align="center" bgcolor="#ccffcc"
| 17
| December 6
| Denver
|
|
|
|
|
|
|- align="center" bgcolor="#ccffcc"
| 18
| December 8, 1988
| Milwaukee
| W 113–109
|
|
|
| Madison Square Garden
| 12–6
|- align="center" bgcolor="#ccffcc"
| 19
| December 10
| Sacramento
|
|
|
|
|
|
|- align="center" bgcolor="#ccffcc"
| 20
| December 13
| New Jersey
|
|
|
|
|
|
|- align="center" bgcolor="#ccffcc"
| 21
| December 15
| Utah
|
|
|
|
|
|
|- align="center" bgcolor="#ccffcc"
| 22
| December 17
| Washington
|
|
|
|
|
|
|- align="center" bgcolor="#ffcccc"
| 23
| December 18
| @ Boston
|
|
|
|
|
|
|- align="center" bgcolor="#ccffcc"
| 24
| December 20
| Indiana
|
|
|
|
|
|
|- align="center" bgcolor="#ccffcc"
| 25
| December 22, 1988
| Detroit
| W 88–85
|
|
|
| Madison Square Garden
| 18–7
|- align="center" bgcolor="#ffcccc"
| 26
| December 27
| @ Atlanta
|
|
|
|
|
|
|- align="center" bgcolor="#ffcccc"
| 27
| December 29
| @ Chicago
| L 106–108
|
|
|
| Chicago Stadium
| 18–9
|- align="center" bgcolor="#ffcccc"
| 28
| December 30
| @ Charlotte
|
|
|
|
|
|

|- align="center" bgcolor="#ccffcc"
| 29
| January 3
| Boston
|
|
|
|
|
|
|- align="center" bgcolor="#ccffcc"
| 30
| January 4
| @ New Jersey
|
|
|
|
|
|
|- align="center" bgcolor="#ffcccc"
| 31
| January 7
| @ Cleveland
|
|
|
|
|
|
|- align="center" bgcolor="#ccffcc"
| 32
| January 8
| L.A. Clippers
|
|
|
|
|
|
|- align="center" bgcolor="#ccffcc"
| 33
| January 11, 1989
| @ Detroit
| W 100–93
|
|
|
| Palace of Auburn Hills
| 22–11
|- align="center" bgcolor="#ccffcc"
| 34
| January 12
| Charlotte
|
|
|
|
|
|
|- align="center" bgcolor="#ccffcc"
| 35
| January 14
| Atlanta
|
|
|
|
|
|
|- align="center" bgcolor="#ccffcc"
| 36
| January 16
| San Antonio
|
|
|
|
|
|
|- align="center" bgcolor="#ffcccc"
| 37
| January 18, 1989
| @ Golden State
| L 119–133
|
|
|
| Oakland-Alameda County Coliseum Arena
| 25–12
|- align="center" bgcolor="#ffcccc"
| 38
| January 19
| @ Sacramento
|
|
|
|
|
|
|- align="center" bgcolor="#ffcccc"
| 39
| January 21, 1989
| @ Seattle
| L 119–121
|
|
|
| Seattle Center Coliseum
| 25–14
|- align="center" bgcolor="#ccffcc"
| 40
| January 22
| @ Portland
|
|
|
|
|
|
|- align="center" bgcolor="#ccffcc"
| 41
| January 24, 1989
| @ L.A. Lakers
| W 122–117
|
|
|
| Great Western Forum
| 27–14
|- align="center" bgcolor="#ffcccc"
| 42
| January 27, 1989
| @ Phoenix
| L 130–132
|
|
|
| Arizona Veterans Memorial Coliseum
| 27–15
|- align="center" bgcolor="#ffcccc"
| 43
| January 28
| @ Utah
|
|
|
|
|
|
|- align="center" bgcolor="#ccffcc"
| 44
| January 31
| Indiana
|
|
|
|
|
|

|- align="center" bgcolor="#ccffcc"
| 45
| February 2
| Cleveland
|
|
|
|
|
|
|- align="center" bgcolor="#ccffcc"
| 46
| February 4
| @ Indiana
|
|
|
|
|
|
|- align="center" bgcolor="#ccffcc"
| 47
| February 7
| Washington
|
|
|
|
|
|
|- align="center" bgcolor="#ccffcc"
| 48
| February 8
| @ Atlanta
|
|
|
|
|
|
|- align="center" bgcolor="#ccffcc"
| 49
| February 14
| @ Charlotte
|
|
|
|
|
|
|- align="center" bgcolor="#ffcccc"
| 50
| February 15
| @ Cleveland
|
|
|
|
|
|
|- align="center" bgcolor="#ccffcc"
| 51
| February 18
| New Jersey
|
|
|
|
|
|
|- align="center" bgcolor="#ccffcc"
| 52
| February 21
| Houston
|
|
|
|
|
|
|- align="center" bgcolor="#ccffcc"
| 53
| February 23
| Charlotte
|
|
|
|
|
|
|- align="center" bgcolor="#ffcccc"
| 54
| February 24
| @ Washington
|
|
|
|
|
|
|- align="center" bgcolor="#ccffcc"
| 55
| February 26
| Boston
|
|
|
|
|
|

|- align="center" bgcolor="#ffcccc"
| 56
| March 1, 1989
| @ Milwaukee
| L 111–121
|
|
|
| Bradley Center
| 37–19
|- align="center" bgcolor="#ccffcc"
| 57
| March 2
| Miami
|
|
|
|
|
|
|- align="center" bgcolor="#ccffcc"
| 58
| March 4, 1989
| Chicago
| W 122–104
|
|
|
| Madison Square Garden
| 39–19
|- align="center" bgcolor="#ccffcc"
| 59
| March 7, 1989
| Phoenix
| W 124–119
|
|
|
| Madison Square Garden
| 40–19
|- align="center" bgcolor="#ccffcc"
| 60
| March 11
| Indiana
|
|
|
|
|
|
|- align="center" bgcolor="#ccffcc"
| 61
| March 14, 1989
| Seattle
| W 116–110
|
|
|
| Madison Square Garden
| 42–19
|- align="center" bgcolor="#ffcccc"
| 62
| March 16
| Philadelphia
|
|
|
|
|
|
|- align="center" bgcolor="#ffcccc"
| 63
| March 17, 1989
| @ Chicago
| L 124–129
|
|
|
| Chicago Stadium
| 42–21
|- align="center" bgcolor="#ccffcc"
| 64
| March 19, 1989
| Milwaukee
| W 128–104
|
|
|
| Madison Square Garden
| 43–21
|- align="center" bgcolor="#ccffcc"
| 65
| March 20
| @ Philadelphia
|
|
|
|
|
|
|- align="center" bgcolor="#ffcccc"
| 66
| March 22
| @ Miami
|
|
|
|
|
|
|- align="center" bgcolor="#ffcccc"
| 67
| March 24
| @ Boston
|
|
|
|
|
|
|- align="center" bgcolor="#ffcccc"
| 68
| March 25
| Atlanta
|
|
|
|
|
|
|- align="center" bgcolor="#ccffcc"
| 69
| March 27
| @ Charlotte
|
|
|
|
|
|
|- align="center" bgcolor="#ccffcc"
| 70
| March 28
| Portland
|
|
|
|
|
|
|- align="center" bgcolor="#ccffcc"
| 71
| March 30
| Dallas
|
|
|
|
|
|
|- align="center" bgcolor="#ffcccc"
| 72
| March 31, 1989
| Golden State
| L 114–134
|
|
|
| Madison Square Garden
| 47–25

|- align="center" bgcolor="#ffcccc"
| 73
| April 4
| Philadelphia
|
|
|
|
|
|
|- align="center" bgcolor="#ccffcc"
| 74
| April 6, 1989
| @ Milwaukee
| W 112–99
|
|
|
| Bradley Center
| 48–26
|- align="center" bgcolor="#ffcccc"
| 75
| April 7
| @ New Jersey
|
|
|
|
|
|
|- align="center" bgcolor="#ccffcc"
| 76
| April 9
| @ Washington
|
|
|
|
|
|
|- align="center" bgcolor="#ffcccc"
| 77
| April 12
| Charlotte
|
|
|
|
|
|
|- align="center" bgcolor="#ccffcc"
| 78
| April 14, 1989
| Detroit
| W 104–100
|
|
|
| Madison Square Garden
| 50–38
|- align="center" bgcolor="#ffcccc"
| 79
| April 16
| @ Philadelphia
|
|
|
|
|
|
|- align="center" bgcolor="#ffcccc"
| 80
| April 17, 1989
| @ Chicago
| L 100–104
|
|
|
| Chicago Stadium
| 50–30
|- align="center" bgcolor="#ccffcc"
| 81
| April 20
| Boston
|
|
|
|
|
|
|- align="center" bgcolor="#ccffcc"
| 82
| April 22
| New Jersey
|
|
|
|
|
|

Playoffs

|- align="center" bgcolor="#ccffcc"
| 1
| April 27
| Philadelphia
| W 102–96
| Gerald Wilkins (34)
| Charles Oakley (12)
| Mark Jackson (9)
| Madison Square Garden19,591
| 1–0
|- align="center" bgcolor="#ccffcc"
| 2
| April 29
| Philadelphia
| W 107–106
| Johnny Newman (20)
| Charles Oakley (12)
| Mark Jackson (10)
| Madison Square Garden19,591
| 2–0
|- align="center" bgcolor="#ccffcc"
| 3
| May 2
| @ Philadelphia
| W 116–115 (OT)
| Mark Jackson (24)
| Charles Oakley (17)
| Mark Jackson (9)
| Spectrum16,236
| 3–0
|-

|- align="center" bgcolor="#ffcccc"
| 1
| May 9, 1989
| Chicago
| L 109–120 (OT)
| Johnny Newman (27)
| Patrick Ewing (10)
| Mark Jackson (11)
| Madison Square Garden19,591
| 0–1
|- align="center" bgcolor="#ccffcc"
| 2
| May 11, 1989
| Chicago
| W 114–97
| Patrick Ewing (23)
| Charles Oakley (13)
| Mark Jackson (16)
| Madison Square Garden19,591
| 1–1
|- align="center" bgcolor="#ffcccc"
| 3
| May 13, 1989
| @ Chicago
| L 88–111
| Patrick Ewing (19)
| Charles Oakley (9)
| Mark Jackson (6)
| Chicago Stadium18,599
| 1–2
|- align="center" bgcolor="#ffcccc"
| 4
| May 14, 1989
| @ Chicago
| L 93–106
| Johnny Newman (23)
| Charles Oakley (16)
| Gerald Wilkins (5)
| Chicago Stadium18,637
| 1–3
|- align="center" bgcolor="#ccffcc"
| 5
| May 16, 1989
| Chicago
| W 121–114
| Patrick Ewing (32)
| Charles Oakley (13)
| Mark Jackson (14)
| Madison Square Garden19,591
| 2–3
|- align="center" bgcolor="#ffcccc"
| 6
| May 19, 1989
| @ Chicago
| L 111–113
| three players tied (22)
| Patrick Ewing (13)
| Mark Jackson (12)
| Chicago Stadium18,676
| 2–4
|-

Player statistics

Season

Playoffs

Awards and records
Patrick Ewing, All-NBA Second Team
Patrick Ewing, NBA All-Defensive Second Team
Rod Strickland, NBA All-Rookie Team 2nd Team

Transactions

References

New York Knicks seasons
New York Knick
New York Knicks
New York Knicks
1980s in Manhattan
Madison Square Garden